The Women's Windy City Open 2015 is the women's edition of the 2015 Windy City Open, which is a PSA World Series event (prize money: 150 000 $). The event took place at the University Club of Chicago in Chicago in the United States from the 26 February to 4 March 2015. Raneem El Weleily won her first Windy City Open trophy, beating Nicol David in the final.

Prize money and ranking points
For 2015, the prize purse was $150,000. The prize money and points breakdown is as follows:

Seeds

Draw and results

Based on Squashsite and WSA sources.

See also
2015 PSA World Tour
Men's Windy City Open 2015
Metro Squash Windy City Open

References

External links
WSA Windy City Open 2015 website
Windy City Open 2015 official website

Windy City Open
Windy City Open
Windy City Open
2015 in women's squash
Women's sports in Illinois
2010s in Chicago
Women in Chicago